Adratiklit (meaning "mountain lizard") is an extinct genus of herbivorous stegosaurian dinosaur that lived on the supercontinent Gondwana during the Middle Jurassic period (168–164 million years ago). The genus contains a single species, Adratiklit boulahfa. Its remains were found in the El Mers Group, probably in the El Mers II Formation (Bathonian), near Boulahfa, south of Boulemane, Fès-Meknes, north Morocco.

Eurypodan dinosaurs, in particular stegosaurs, were diverse and abundant in Laurasia (nowadays the northern continents) during the Jurassic, but their remains are extremely rare in deposits of Gondwana, (nowadays the southern continents). Nevertheless, the existence of fragmentary remains and trackways in the deposits of Gondwana indicate the presence of eurypodan taxa there. Adratiklit is the first described eurypodan taxon from North Africa, as well as the second oldest known stegosaur (being slightly younger than Bashanosaurus), with the possible exception of Isaberrysaura and "Ferganastegos", which may be as old as Adratiklit.

Discovery and naming 

Adratiklit boulahfa was described by Susannah C.R. Maidment, Thomas J. Raven, Driss Ouarhache and Paul M. Barrett on 16 August 2019 in an article published online in paleontological journal Gondwana Research; the article was published physically in January 2020. The holotype of Adratiklit boulahfa is a dorsal vertebra, NHMUK PV R37366. Referred specimens include three cervical vertebrae (NHMUK PV R37367 and NHMUK R37368, the latter specimen consisting of a series of two articulated bones), a dorsal vertebra (NHMUK PV R37365) and a left humerus (NHMUK PV R37007). The specimens were acquired by the Natural History Museum in the United Kingdom from fossil traders. They represent multiple individuals, probably five. While the second dorsal vertebra shares traits with the holotype, the other referrals are merely based on the fact that the material is stegosaurian. An attempt in 2018 to locate the site did not produce any relevant fossils but led to a deeper insight into the geology.

The generic name Adratiklit is derived from the Berber words "adrar", meaning "mountain", and "tiklit", meaning lizard. The specific name, boulahfa, refers to the area of Boulahfa near where the specimen was said to be found.

Description 
While the holotype for Adratiklit only includes a dorsal vertebra, a few other remains are known, including an upper arm bone and additional vertebrae.

The describers established two autapomorphies, or unique derived traits. With the dorsal vertebrae, the prezygapophysis has a small triangular rough protrusion on top, behind the front articulation facet of the vertebral body. With the dorsal vertebrae, the centroparapophysal laminae being drawn on the anteriorly-projecting rugosities that are located on either side of the neural canal in dorsal vertebrae, the ridges between the vertebral body and the parapophyses, the contact facets for the lower rib heads, end in rough areas protruding to the front on both sides of the front opening of the neural canal. These traits are unique for the Stegosauria as a whole and are diagnostic to this taxa. The size of Adratiklit is not known due to a lack of fossil remains.

Classification 
Adratiklit is a basal stegosaurian. It is more closely related to the European stegosaurs Dacentrurus and Miragaia than it is to the southern African taxa Kentrosaurus and Paranthodon. This places it in the subfamily Dacentrurinae, which was previously thought to be confined to the Late Jurassic of Europe.

See also
 Timeline of stegosaur research

References 

Middle Jurassic dinosaurs of Africa
Stegosaurs
Fossil taxa described in 2019
Ornithischian genera